Knox Raiders is a member club of the NBL1 South based in Melbourne, Victoria. The club fields both a men's and women's team. The club is a division of Knox Basketball Incorporated (KBI), the major administrative basketball organisation in Melbourne's eastern suburbs. The Raiders play their home games at the State Basketball Centre.

Club history
Knox Basketball was established in 1965 to provide youth from the City of Knox with a sporting and social infrastructure to develop and promote personal, team and social skills in a sporting environment. Founded by Alf Stevens, Alice Jago and Heather Kemp, it began as an after school competition at the Mossfield Avenue Facility, Ferntree Gully in 1974. In 1980, its headquarters moved to the 3 court facility in Park Crescent at Boronia which was later expanded to six courts in 1989.

In 1982, Knox's senior program was established, with a Raiders men's team entering the South East Australian Basketball League (SEABL) that year, followed by the women's team in 1990. In 1991, the Raiders men were South Conference champions and SEABL champions. The men won five more conference titles between 1994 and 2009, with 2009 also seeing the Raiders win the SEABL championship. The Raiders women meanwhile won their first SEABL championship in 1992, before claiming the SEABL-ABA championship double in 1994 and 1996. They next saw success in 2013 with the SEABL championship.

In November 2014, Knox Basketball Incorporated withdrew its Knox Raiders SEABL teams from the 2015 season due to its dire financial position. The Raiders requested they remain a financial member of the SEABL with the intention of returning in season 2016. The SEABL retained the club's financial guarantee with the Raiders classified as a non-playing member of the league in 2015.

In November 2015, KBI announced that their senior men's and women's teams would be playing in the Big V State Championship instead of the SEABL in 2016.

In October 2018, KBI's Big V teams were entered into the newly-established NBL1 for the 2019 season. The NBL1 South season did not go ahead in 2020 due to the COVID-19 pandemic.

References

External links
 KBI's official website

Basketball teams established in 1982
1982 establishments in Australia
Basketball teams in Melbourne
Sport in the City of Knox